Huya may refer to:

 Huya Live, a live streaming service in China
 Huya (mythology), the rain god of the Wayuu people of Venezuela and Colombia
 Huya (noble), an Egyptian official during the reign of Akhenaten, Egypt 18th dynasty
 38628 Huya, a plutino and dwarf-planet candidate discovered in 2000

See also 
 HUYA Bioscience International, a biotech consulting firm founded by Mireille Gingras